Terry Rhoads (December 31, 1951 – October 11, 2013) was an American television actor. In 1998, he played the leading role in the short-lived situation comedy Living in Captivity.

Career

Rhoads appeared on television, usually playing supporting characters. As such he appeared such television programs as Murphy Brown, Grace Under Fire, Seinfeld, Party of Five, 7th Heaven, The Norm Show, The Drew Carey Show, Friends, Yes, Dear, 3rd Rock from the Sun, Ally McBeal, Malcolm in the Middle, Navy NCIS, Phil of the Future, House M.D., Desperate Housewives, My Wife and Kids, Hannah Montana, What I Like About You, Two and a Half Men, That '70s Show, Better Off Ted, among others.

Personal life/death
Rhoads died of amyloidosis on October 11, 2013, aged 61, in Los Angeles, California. Rhoads was married to actress Lise Simms until his death; the couple had two children.

References

External links

1951 births
2013 deaths
American male film actors
American male television actors
Deaths from amyloidosis